Ravichandran Ashwin (born 17 September 1986) is an Indian international cricketer who plays for the Indian cricket team. He currently plays for Tamil Nadu in domestic cricket and Rajasthan Royals in the Indian Premier League. He is the fastest Indian bowler (also in some records the joint-fastest in the world) to reach the 50-, 100-, 150-, 200-, 250-, 300-, 350-,400- and 450- wicket mark in Test cricket in terms of number of innings. In 2016, he became the third Indian to win the ICC Cricketer of the Year award. He is currently the highest-ranked spinner in Test cricket, and the highest-ranked Test bowler for India on the ICC Player Rankings. He has won nine Man of the Series awards in Test cricket, which is the highest by an Indian cricketer. He has also scored 5 Test centuries with a highest score of 124.

Having achieved little success as an opening batsman at junior-level cricket, Ashwin dropped down the order and turned into an off-break bowler. He made his first-class debut for Tamil Nadu in December 2006 and captained the team the following season. However, it was not until the 2010 Indian Premier League in which he played for the Chennai Super Kings that he came into the limelight with his economical bowling and earned his maiden international call-up in the limited-overs formats in June 2010. He was the leading wicket-taker and player of the tournament of the 2010 Champions League Twenty20 in South Africa. He was also part of the Indian squad that won the 2011 Cricket World Cup. Later that year, he made his Test debut against West Indies and became the seventh Indian bowler to take a five-wicket haul on Test debut. He took two five-wicket hauls and scored a century in that series and won the player of the series award.

Ashwin continued to succeed in the subcontinent but proved to be less effective in other places like Australia and England. In a home Test series against Australia in 2013, he took 29 wickets, the most by any Indian bowler in a four-match Test series. The same year, he took his 100th Test wicket in his 18th match, becoming the fastest Indian bowler to the milestone and the fastest in the world in over 80 years. In 2017, playing his 45th Test, Ashwin became the fastest bowler to pick up 250 Test wickets, bettering Dennis Lillee, who had achieved the landmark in 48 Tests. In October 2019, in his 66th Test match, Ashwin became the joint-fastest bowler, along with Muttiah Muralitharan, to take his 350th Test wicket.

On 10 April 2022, he became the first batsman to officially retire out in an IPL match during a league stage match between Rajasthan Royals and Lucknow Super Giants. He is the one of the few players to reach 3000+ runs & 450+ wickets in tests and overall 2nd quickest player to reach this landmark.

Early years
Ashwin was born on 17 September 1986 in Chennai, Tamil Nadu. He lives in West Mambalam, Chennai. His father Ravichandran played cricket at club level as a fast bowler. Ashwin was educated at Padma Seshadri Bala Bhavan and St. Bede's Anglo Indian Higher Secondary School. He also attended SSN college of engineering, Chennai and graduated with a BTech in Information Technology. His time at St. Bede's was particularly important, as it had a cricket academy. Ashwin has stated that coaches C. K. Vijay and Chandra at St Bede's played a big role in his career, where he had changed his bowling style from medium pace to off spin.

Career

2010–present: International career
On the back of his impressive performance in the 2010 Indian Premier League, Ashwin was selected in a second-string squad that toured Zimbabwe in May–June 2010. He made his ODI debut against Sri Lanka on 5 June 2010, scoring a 32–ball 38 and taking 2/50 in that match which India lost to crash out of the tri-series. His T20I debut came a week later, against Zimbabwe at Harare where he took 1/22 in four overs in an Indian win. Ashwin was selected for the tri-series against New Zealand and hosts Sri Lanka, but did not get a game with Pragyan Ojha and Ravindra Jadeja being preferred over him throughout the series. In October, the selectors decided to rest first-choice players in the three-match home ODI series against Australia, enabling Ashwin to get selected in the team again. Ashwin was the most economical bowler in the only match played in the series in which he took 1/34 in nine overs while India registered a five-wicket victory.

Ashwin played in all five matches of the home series against New Zealand in November–December 2010. India completed a 5–0 whitewash and Ashwin ended up as the leading wicket-taker of the series with 11 wickets at an average of 21.90. At the conclusion of the series, Ashwin earned the praise of captain Gautam Gambhir, who called him "the find" of the series and hailed his bowling during the powerplay overs. Despite this success, Ashwin failed to make it to the playing eleven in any of the five ODIs on the South African tour, with the inclusion of lead spinner Harbhajan Singh in the team. However, Ashwin did manage to find a place in the 15-member World Cup squad that was announced during the series, with Harbhajan and Piyush Chawla being the other two specialist spinners in the squad.

Ashwin played the fourth and fifth ODI of India's tour of West Indies in June–July 2011 but picked just one wicket. Ashwin was retained in the limited-overs squad for the England tour. He emerged as India's best bowler of the series, which India lost 3–0, taking six wickets at an average of 25.16. England toured India in October 2011 and were whitewashed in the ODI series 5–0. With 10 scalps at 20.20, Ashwin was as the second highest wicket-taker of the series, only behind teammate Jadeja.

In November 2011, West Indies toured India for three Tests and five ODIs. Ashwin and Ojha were the only two specialist spinners in the squad, with Harbhajan being omitted owing to his indifferent form during the England tour. Ashwin made his Test debut in the first match at Delhi, earning his cap from Sachin Tendulkar. Ashwin took 3/81 in the first innings and 6/47 in the second, helping India win the match. He was awarded the man of the match and became the third Indian player to win the award on Test debut. He picked four wickets in the second Test at Kolkata where India registered an innings victory. In the third Test at Mumbai, he took 5/156 while West Indies made a total of 590 and scored his maiden international century in India's first innings (103 runs from 118 balls) to take India's total to 482. Ashwin thus became the third Indian to score a century and take a five-wicket haul in the same Test and the first since 1962. West Indies were bowled out for 134 in their second innings as Ojha and Ashwin shared all ten wickets between them, with Ashwin picking 4/34. The match ended in a draw with the scores level, after Ashwin took a single and was dismissed run out attempting a second run off the last ball of the match. He was awarded the man of the match as well as the man of the series for his all-round performance. Ashwin featured in four matches of the subsequent ODI series and took four wickets at 49.00.

Ashwin was ineffective on India's 2011/12 tour of Australia. He played in three Tests on the tour taking nine wickets at an average of more than 62. He also featured in the subsequent triangular CB Series against Australia and Sri Lanka and took seven wickets in as many matches at 43.42. In March 2012, he took five wickets in three matches of the 2012 Asia Cup in Bangladesh. He had a quiet tour of Sri Lanka in July–August 2012 taking five wickets at 39.40 in the five-match ODI series and 1/22 in the one-off T20I.

Ashwin returned to form during the two-match home Test series against New Zealand. In the first Test at Hyderabad, he claimed 6/31 and 6/54 helping India seal an innings victory and was named the man of the match. His match figures of 12/85 bettered S. Venkataraghavan's 12/152 for the best figures by an Indian bowler against New Zealand in Tests. In the second match at Bangalore his efforts of 5/69 in the second innings helped India win the match and the series 2–0. He was awarded man of the series for his tally of 18 wickets at 13.11 average. Ashwin played four matches in the 2012 ICC World Twenty20 in Sri Lanka and took five wickets at an economy rate of 6 and an average of 19.

During the first Test of England's tour of India in late 2012, Ashwin became the fastest Indian to record 50 wickets in Test cricket as he overhauled the milestone in his ninth game. India eventually lost the series 2–1 in which he struggled with the ball managing to take only 14 wickets in the four Tests at an average of 52.64. However, he scored 243 runs, averaging 60.75 per innings, including two fifties and finished as India's second best batsman of the series. In the three-match ODI series against Pakistan and the five-match ODI series against England, he took three wickets at 43.33 and seven wickets at 35.71 respectively.

While playing for India Cements at the BCCI Corporate Trophy in February 2013, Ashwin worked with former Tamil Nadu spinner and childhood coach Sunil Subramaniam to make changes to his bowling ahead of the four-match Test series against Australia. Subramaniam and Ashwin spent a few hours every day for a week at the nets in Nagpur. Among the changes made was shortening Ashwin's bowling stride.

Ashwin was highly successful on Australia's four-Test tour of India in February–March 2013. In the first Test at Chennai, his home ground, he took 7/103 and 5/95 leading India to a comfortable eight-wicket victory. He had a haul of 5/63 in the second innings of the second Test at Hyderabad where India registered an innings win. He took a total of four wickets in the Mohali Test where India sealed the series with a six-wicket victory. In the last match at Delhi, he took 5/57 and 2/55 in another Indian win which completed a 4–0 whitewash of Australia. During the match, Ashwin surpassed former India captain Anil Kumble's tally of 27 wickets for most wickets by an Indian bowler in a four-Test series. Ashwin finished the series as the leading wicket-taker with a tally of 29 wickets at 20.10 and won the Man of the Series award. It was the first time India won four or more Tests in a series and the first time Australia was whitewashed since 1969–70. Ashwin also became the third Indian off-spinner to take 25-plus wickets in a series after E. A. S. Prasanna and Harbhajan Singh.

Ashwin was a member of the Indian team that won the 2013 ICC Champions Trophy in England. His figures of 2/15 in four overs in the 20-overs-a-side final helped India restrict England to 124/8 and win the match by five runs. He had a total of eight wickets from five matches at an average of 22.62, conceding 4.41 runs per over, and ended as the joint-fifth highest wicket-taker of the tournament. He was named as part of the 'Team of the Tournament' by Cricinfo. With nine wickets in six matches, Ashwin finished as the leading wicket-taker of the home ODI series against Australia in October–November 2013 which India won 3–2.

On India's tour of South Africa, Ashwin had a difficult time with the ball. He picked only one wicket across three ODIs and went wicketless in his 42 overs in the first Test at Johannesburg, following which, he lost his spot in the team to Jadeja for the second Test. In early 2014, Ashwin's overseas struggles continued during the New Zealand tour where he managed to bag a solitary wicket in the five-match ODI series which India lost 4–0. However, in the third ODI, coming in to bat with India at 146/5 in pursuit of 315, he scored his maiden ODI fifty of 65 runs from 46 balls. He shared a 38-run partnership with Dhoni and an 85-run seventh wicket stands with Jadeja, as the match eventually ended in a tie. In the two-match Test series that followed, Jadeja was preferred over Ashwin as the lone spinner in the playing eleven.

Ashwin was back among the wickets when India went to Bangladesh for the 2014 Asia Cup and the 2014 ICC World Twenty20. He took nine wickets in four matches of the Asia Cup and finished as the joint-third highest wicket-taker of the tournament. He played a vital role in India's unbeaten run to the World Twenty20 final. His tally of 11 wickets in six matches at an average of 11.27 and economy rate of 5.35 put him joint third on the list of most wickets in the tournament. He was named in the 'Team of the Tournament for the 2014 T20 World Cup by the ICC and Cricinfo.

Ashwin was part of the Indian team that toured England in 2014. He played his first match of the Test series only in the fourth game in which he scored 40 and 46 not out but went wicketless in an innings defeat for India. He took three wickets in the last match, which was another innings defeat. India and Ashwin found more success in the ODI series that followed. With India winning the series 3–1, Ashwin took seven wickets from four matches at an average of 24.85 and an economy rate of less than 4.5. India whitewashed Sri Lanka in a five-match ODI series in November 2014 in which Ashwin had 6 wickets to his name at 33.33.

Debutant leg-spinner Karn Sharma was chosen over Ashwin for the first Test of India's tour of Australia in December 2014. After Sharma's indifferent debut, Ashwin returned to the playing eleven as the lone spinner and took a total of 12 wickets at an average of 48.66 in the remaining three matches.

Ashwin was selected to represent India for the second consecutive ODI World cup to be held in Australia-New Zealand in 2015. He was also named as bench for the 'Team of the tournament' by Cricbuzz.

In the 2015 three-match series against Sri Lanka, he dismissed Kumar Sangakkara, who was retiring following the second Test, four consecutive times in his final four innings. At the end of the series, he finished with 21 wickets and in the process, broke the record for most wickets by an Indian bowler in a series against Sri Lanka. He was awarded the Man of the Series. These efforts led him to achieve the number 1 ranking in ICC Test Bowling Rankings for the year 2015 (which he retained in 2016).

In November 2015, Ashwin was a star performer throughout the Freedom Trophy Test series against South Africa in India. During the course of the series, he became the fastest Indian to reach 150 wickets in Test cricket. In the third Test in Nagpur, he picked up 12 wickets for 98 runs to hand South Africa their first away series loss in nine years. His career-best figures of 7/66 in the second innings bowled the visitors out for 185 and gave India a 2–0 series win. For his performances in 2015, he was named as 12th man in the World Test XI by the ICC. He was also named in the Test XI of the year 2015 by Cricinfo.

In New Zealand's tour of India in 2016, Ashwin took 27 wickets in 3 Tests, including a career-best of 7 for 59 in an innings.

For his performances in 2016, he was named in the World Test XI by the ICC and Cricinfo.

In December 2016, the International Cricket Council named Ashwin the ICC Cricketer of the Year and the ICC Test Cricketer of the Year for 2016. In the process, he became the third Indian to win the Sir Garfield Sobers Trophy for the ICC Cricketer of the Year after Rahul Dravid and Sachin Tendulkar, and also the second cricketer ever after Dravid to win the two awards in the same year.

For his performances in 2017, he was named in the World Test XI by the ICC.

In September 2021, Ashwin was named in India's squad for the 2021 ICC Men's T20 World Cup.

He made a comeback in white-ball cricket in India's third match of the tournament against Afghanistan and bowled a good spell of 2–14 in 4 overs.

In December 2021, Ashwin was ranked second in the ICC Men's Test Player Rankings for bowlers and all-rounders.

Indian Premier League 
From 2008 to 2015, he used to play for a Chennai Super Kings.

In March 2019, in a match against Rajasthan Royals, Ashwin mankaded Jos Buttler reigniting the debate around dismissal in this manner.

In 2019, Ashwin was traded to Delhi Capitals ahead of the 2020 Indian Premier League. He took 13 wickets in the season and was the fourth highest wicket taker in the team. Delhi retained him for the 2021 season.

In the 2022 IPL Auction, Ashwin was bought by the Rajasthan Royals for ₹5 crores. During the group stage match between Rajasthan Royals and Lucknow Super Giants in the IPL 2022, he tactically retired out in the 19th over of the Rajasthan Royals innings after coming in at no 6 scoring 28 off 23 deliveries. He became only the fourth player to retire out in T20 cricket after Shahid Afridi, Sonam Tobgay and Sunzamul Islam.

In April 2022, Ashwin became only the second off-spinner after Harbhajan Singh to achieve a milestone of 150 wickets in the history of Indian Premier League.

Bowling style
Ashwin produces several variations of the ball and flights the ball, thereby giving it more chance to spin and dip on the batsman. In addition to his normal off-breaks, he produces an arm ball and the carrom ball, the latter of which he uses frequently in the shorter formats. In IPL 2013, he bowled leg-breaks and googly as well. However, in an interview, he has stated that he refrains from bowling the doosra as it requires him to bend and straighten his arm which he finds difficult to do.

Ashwin's childhood coach Sunil Subramaniam recalls Ashwin's early days at the TNCA Academy:

[...] what struck me was his intelligence. His use of angles, length and width of the crease. Also, guessing what a batsman was likely to do. And the kind of field placing that he is comfortable with. Those are the factors that struck me immediately – that this guy not only loves bowling, he also has a fair idea of what spin actually is. For somebody who started out at 18 or 19, I thought that was a big thing [...] Here is a guy who knew what the ball is supposed to do, where this guy is expected to play and what are the plans to keep that guy in check and put pressure on that guy. He was pretty clear at 18 itself.

Personal life

On 13 November 2011, Ashwin married his childhood friend Prithi Narayanan. They have two children named Akhira and Aadhya.

The Tamil Nadu State Election Commission used Ashwin to help create electoral awareness by encouraging voters to check whether their names were on the electoral roll.

Records and achievements
He is fastest among Indian bowlers to reach 50, 100, 150, 200, 250, 300, 350, 400 and 450 test wickets milestone.
Ashwin is ranked number 1 among bowlers and 2 among all-rounders in Test cricket as of March 2023
In his 37th Test match, Ashwin became the fastest Indian bowler and the second fastest in the world to reach 200 Test wickets after Australian spinner Clarrie Grimmett (36 matches). 
He is fastest to reach 250, 300 and 350 wickets in test cricket.  
Ashwin became the first Indian cricketer to score a century and take five wickets in the same Test match on three separate instances.  
In 2016, Ravichandran Ashwin became first Indian to take 50 T20I wickets. 
On 23 August 2016, Ashwin grabbed his sixth Man-of-the-Series Award, surpassing the tie by Sachin Tendulkar and Virender Sehwag, and in only his 13th Test series, and 8th series where he played every Test. 
On 10 October 2016, Ashwin took his 20th five-wicket haul, making him the third fastest to reach the landmark.
On 27 November 2016, he completed a double of 500 runs and 50 wickets in 2016. He is the second all-rounder from India to achieve this in a single calendar year after Kapil Dev.
Ashwin was the world's highest wicket taker in 2016 with 72 scalps.
On 12 February 2017, with the dismissal of Mushfiqur Rahim, Ashwin became the fastest to reach 250 test wickets. 
In India's 2016–17 home season, Ashwin took 64 wickets in 13 Tests, becoming the highest wicket-taker for India in a single domestic season, surpassing Kapil Dev's record of 63 wickets in 10 Tests during the 1979–80 season. 
During the home test series against Australia, he became the fastest bowler to take 25 fifers in test history in terms of matches(47) and in terms of innings(89). 
He along with Ravindra Jadeja became the first pair of spinners to be jointly ranked number 1 bowler in ICC Test Rankings history 
In the 4th and final Test match against Australia national cricket team at Dharamshala Cricket Stadium, March 2017, Ashwin dismissed Steve Smith and took his wickets' tally to 79. This is the most number of wickets by a bowler in a home season surpassing Dale Steyn's record of 78 in 2007–08. 
In November 2015, he became fastest Indian to 150 wickets as well during his 5 wicket haul against South Africa at Mohali.
In September 2016, he became the fastest Indian and second overall to get 200 wickets by dismissing Kane Williamson in India's 500th test match. 
On 27 November 2017, during the second Test against Sri Lanka, Ashwin became the fastest bowler to reach 300 Test wickets in his 54th Test. His 300th victim was Sri Lankan tail-ender batsman Lahiru Gamage. India won the match by an innings margin along with the milestone. The previous record holder was Australian fast bowling legend Dennis Lillee who had reached the milestone in 56 Test matches way back in 1981. 
In November 2020, Ashwin was nominated for the Sir Garfield Sobers Award for ICC Male Cricketer of the Decade. 
In the next month, Ashwin became the bowler for dismissing most left-handers (200 left hand batsman dismissals as of February 16, 2021) in Test cricket surpassing Muralitharan previous record (191). 
In February 2021, he became the fourth Indian to take 400 wickets in Test cricket. Ashwin also became the second fastest bowler ever to achieve the landmark (77 Tests) after Muttiah Muralitharan (73 Tests). 
On 6 December 2021, Ashwin became only the second Indian bowler to take 300 Test wickets in home conditions, after Anil Kumble. 
Ashwin took the highest wickets (71) in the inaugural World Test Championship. In January 2022, Ashwin was named in ICC Men's Test Team of the Year for the year 2021. 
In March 2022, he became the second leading wicket taker (436) in tests for India, surpassing Kapil Dev (434).
Ashwin Becomes Second Indian Bowler After Anil Kumble to Complete 450 Test Wickets.
Ashwin Becomes Second Indian Bowler After Anil Kumble to Take 100 Wickets Against Australia.

Honours
 ICC Cricketer of the Year: 2016
 CEAT International Cricketer of the Year: 2016–17
 ICC Men's Player of the Month: February 2021
 Indian Premier League Champion: 2010, 2011

Other interests 

 Ravichandran Ashwin is active on YouTube through his channel where he analyses Cricket and movies. His channel has over a million subscribers.
 Ashwin runs his own cricket academy called "Gen-Next Cricket Institute" in Chennai where he mentors young kids.

See also
 List of international cricket five-wicket hauls by Ravichandran Ashwin
 List of India cricketers who have taken five-wicket hauls on Test debut

References

External links

 
 R Ashwin's profile page on Wisden
 Ravichandran Ashwin ready with his mystery ball
 

1986 births
Living people
India Test cricketers
India One Day International cricketers
India Twenty20 International cricketers
Tamil Nadu cricketers
South Zone cricketers
India Blue cricketers
India Red cricketers
India Green cricketers
Chennai Super Kings cricketers
Cricketers who have taken five wickets on Test debut
Cricketers at the 2011 Cricket World Cup
Cricketers at the 2015 Cricket World Cup
Indian cricketers
Cricketers from Chennai
Padma Seshadri Bala Bhavan schools alumni
Rising Pune Supergiant cricketers
International Cricket Council Cricketer of the Year
Worcestershire cricketers
Punjab Kings cricketers
Tamil sportspeople
Delhi Capitals cricketers
Recipients of the Arjuna Award
Surrey cricketers
Rajasthan Royals cricketers